Irene Mann (1929–1996) was a German dancer, actress and choreographer.

Selected filmography
 The Last Waltz (1953)
 As Long as There Are Pretty Girls (1955)
 That Won't Keep a Sailor Down (1958)
 Marina (1960)
 Our Crazy Nieces (1963)

References

Bibliography
 Robert Ignatius Letellier. Operetta: A Sourcebook, Volume II, Volume 2. Cambridge Scholars Publishing, 2015.

External links

1929 births
1996 deaths
German female dancers
German choreographers
German film actresses
Actors from Königsberg
Recipients of the Order of Merit of Berlin